Henry John George Herbert, 3rd Earl of Carnarvon, FRS (8 June 1800 – 10 December 1849), styled Lord Porchester from 1811 to 1833, was a British writer, traveller, nobleman, and politician.

Background and education
Herbert was born in London, the eldest son of Henry Herbert, 2nd Earl of Carnarvon and Elizabeth "Kitty" Acland, daughter of John Dyke Acland of Pixton Park in Somerset. He was educated at Eton College and Christ Church, Oxford.

Public life
In 1831, Porchester was elected to the House of Commons for Wootton Bassett as a Tory, a seat he held until the following year when the constituency was abolished by the Great Reform Act. In 1833 he succeeded his father in the earldom and entered the House of Lords. He was elected a Fellow of the Royal Society in 1841. It was during Carnarvon's lifetime that the family seat of Highclere Castle was redesigned and rebuilt by Sir Charles Barry into a Victorian mansion.

Cricket
Herbert played first-class cricket in 1822 when he was recorded in one match, totalling 1 run with a highest score of 1 and holding 2 catches.

Marriage and issue
In 1830, Lord Carnarvon married Henrietta Anna Howard-Molyneux-Howard (died 1876), eldest daughter of Lord Henry Howard-Molyneux-Howard, by whom he had three sons and two daughters:

Henry Herbert, 4th Earl of Carnarvon (1831–1890), a prominent Conservative politician.
 Lady Eveline Alicia Juliana Howard Herbert (1834–1906), who married Isaac Newton Wallop, 5th Earl of Portsmouth. Her memorial stained-glass window survives in Brushford Church in Somerset, near her father's mansion at Pixton Park.
The Hon. Alan Percy Harty Molyneux Howard Herbert (1836–1907), a physician who was awarded the Legion of Honour by the French government in 1871 for his service as a doctor during the siege of Paris in the Franco-Prussian War, and remained there as the physician in charge of the Hertford Hospital until 1901. He inherited the estate of Tetton (a former Acland property) from his first cousin Edward Henry Charles Herbert (1837–1870), only son of Edward Charles Hugh Herbert (1802–1852) of Tetton, MP for Callington, second son of Henry Herbert, 2nd Earl of Carnarvon, husband of the heiress Kitty Acland. 
Hon. Auberon Edward William Molyneux Howard Herbert (1838–1906), a writer, theorist, philosopher, and  individualist, an MP for Nottingham 1870–1874.
Lady Gwendolen Ondine Herbert (1842–1915), died unmarried

Death 
He died at Pusey, Oxfordshire, in December 1849, aged 49. He was succeeded in the earldom by his eldest son, Henry Herbert, 4th Earl of Carnarvon.

References

External links 
 

1800 births
1849 deaths
English cricketers
English cricketers of 1787 to 1825
Henry Herbert, 03rd Earl of Carnarvon
3
Members of the Parliament of the United Kingdom for English constituencies
UK MPs 1831–1832
UK MPs who inherited peerages
People educated at Eton College
Alumni of Christ Church, Oxford
Fellows of the Royal Society
Marylebone Cricket Club First 8 with 3 Others cricketers